John Trout Greble (January 19, 1834 in Philadelphia – June 10, 1861 in Virginia) was a soldier in the United States Army and the Union army in the American Civil War. He was killed at the battle of Big Bethel, and was the first graduate of the United States Military Academy to be killed in the war.

Biography
He graduated from the U. S. Military Academy in 1854, was assigned to the 2nd artillery, and stationed at Newport, Rhode Island. In September 1854 he was made 2nd lieutenant and sent to Tampa, Florida, where he served in the Indian troubles for two years. He was compelled, in consequence of a severe fever, to return home on sick leave, but in the beginning of 1856 resumed his duties, acting part of the time as quartermaster and commissary until December 1856, when he was appointed acting assistant professor of geography, history, and ethics in the U.S. Military Academy, where he remained until September 24, 1860. He was promoted to 1st lieutenant on March 3, 1857.

He was detailed for active duty at Fort Monroe in late 1860, and rendered efficient service in preventing its seizure. On May 26, 1861, he was sent to Newport News as master of ordnance, superintended the fortifications of that point, and trained the volunteers to artillery practice. When the expedition to Big Bethel was planned, he was unexpectedly detailed to accompany it with two guns, though in his own judgment it was ill-advised. When the Union Army troops were repelled, by his management of the guns he protected them from pursuit and destruction. Just at the close of the action, when he had given the orders to withdraw his guns from the field, he was struck by a rifle ball on the right temple and instantly killed. For his bravery in the two days' action, he was brevetted captain, major, and lieutenant colonel, on the day of his death. First Buried in Philadelphia's Woodland Cemetery, he was later reburied in West Laurel Hill Cemetery, Bala Cynwyd, Montgomery County Pennsylvania.

Two U.S. Army forts were named for him; Fort Greble in the defenses of Washington, DC in 1861 and another Fort Greble in the 1890s on Dutch Island, Rhode Island.

Family
He married Sarah Bradley French, daughter of West Point professor John W. French. Their son, Edwin St. John Greble, who was born at West Point, New York, became a major general of the U.S. Army.

Further reading
 Benson J. Lossing. Memoir of Lieut.-Col. John T. Greble, of the United States Army. Philadelphia, 1870

Notes

References

External links
  – for grave marker in West Laural Hill Cemetery, Bala Cynwyd, Pennsylvania
  – for burial information at Philadelphia's Woodland Cemetery
 

1834 births
1861 deaths
Union Army officers
United States Military Academy alumni
United States Army officers
Union military personnel killed in the American Civil War